The 1951 Ukrainian Cup was a football knockout competition conducting by the Football Federation of the Ukrainian SSR and was known as the Ukrainian Cup.

Competition schedule

First elimination round

Second elimination round

Quarterfinals

Semifinals

Final
The final was held in Kyiv.

Top goalscorers

See also
Soviet Cup
Ukrainian Cup

Notes

References

External links 
Information source 

1951
Cup
1951 domestic association football cups